Albert Costa defeated Juan Carlos Ferrero in the final, 6–1, 6–0, 4–6, 6–3 to win the men's singles tennis title at the 2002 French Open.

Gustavo Kuerten was the two-time defending champion, but lost in the fourth round to Costa.

At this tournament, Feliciano López began his record run of 79 consecutive major main draw appearances that spanned twenty years, ending at the 2022 Australian Open.

Seeds

Qualifying

Draw

Finals

Top half

Section 1

Section 2

Section 3

Section 4

Bottom half

Section 5

Section 6

Section 7

Section 8

External links
Main Draw
Qualifying Draw
2002 French Open – Men's draws and results at the International Tennis Federation

Men's Singles
French Open by year – Men's singles